Pg9

It has featured Avishai Cohen, Rufus Reid, Paul Wertico, John Riley, Jean Toussaint, Martin Taylor, Soweto Kinch, Alec Dankworth, Michael Manring, Yellow Jackets, Ulf Wakenius, Andreas Oberg, Dominique DiPiazza, Norma Winstone, Cleveland Watkiss, Todd Coolman as well as Irish jazz musicians such as Louis Stewart, Mike Nielsen, Linley Hamilton, and David Lyttle. In 2011, Sligo Jazz Project had over eighty participants from twelve countries and offered full bursaries to four "exceptional young musicians".

References

External links
 Official website

Jazz festivals in Ireland
Summer schools